This is a list of notable events in music that took place in 1552.

Events 
 Injunctions of Robert Holgate, Archbishop of York, silence the organs of York Minster.

Publications

Music 
Martin Agricola – Hymns, collected by Georg Thym
Giovanni Animuccia – First book of motets for five voices (Rome: Valerio & Aloisio Dorico)
Bálint Bakfark –  (Lyon: Jacques Moderne), a collection of lute intabulations of works by various composers
Pierre Certon – First book of chansons for four voices (Paris: Le Roy & Ballard)
Adrianus Petit Coclico –  for four voices (Nuremberg: Johann vom Berg & Ulrich Neuber), a collection of psalm settings
Hans Gerle –  (Nuremberg: Hieronymous Formschneider), a collection of pieces by various Italian lutenists in German lute tablature
Claude Goudimel –   for four voices (Paris: Nicolas du Chemin)
Jean de Latre – Chansons for four voices (Leuven: Pierre Phalèse & Martin Rotaire)
Claude Le Jeune – 4 
Guillaume de Morlaye
First book of lute tablature (Paris: Michel Fezendat)
Fourth book of guitar tablature (Paris: Michel Fezendat)
Diego Pisador –  (Salamanca: Diego Pisador), a collection of transcriptions for the vihuela of songs by various composers

Theory 
 Adrianus Petit Coclico –  (Musical compendium)

Births 
December 21 – Richard Day, music printer (died before 1607)
date unknown – Girolamo Belli, Italian composer and music teacher (died c.1620)

Deaths 
January 8 – Eustorg de Beaulieu, French poet and composer
January 10 – Johann Cochlaeus, humanist and music theorist (born 1479)
February 26 – Heinrich Faber, German music theorist, composer, and Kantor (born c.1500)

References

 
16th century in music
Music
Music by year